These are the official results of the Women's 3.000 metres event at the 1987 IAAF World Championships in Rome, Italy. There were a total number of 30 participating athletes and one non-starter, with two qualifying heats and the final held on Tuesday 1987-09-01.

Medalists

Records
Existing records at the start of the event.

Final

Qualifying heats
Held on Saturday 1987-08-29

See also
 1983 Women's World Championships 3.000 metres (Helsinki)
 1984 Women's Olympic 3.000 metres (Los Angeles)
 1986 Women's European Championships 3.000 metres (Stuttgart)
 1988 Women's Olympic 3.000 metres (Seoul)
 1990 Women's European Championships 3.000 metres (Split)
 1991 Women's World Championships 3.000 metres (Tokyo)

References
 Results

 
1987 in women's athletics